Palencia is a city in the autonomous community of Castile and León, Spain.

Palencia may also refer to:
Province of Palencia, a province in the autonomous community of Castile and León, Spain
Palencia de Negrilla, a municipality of the province of Salamanca in the autonomous community of Castile and León, Spain
CF Palencia was a Spanish football team based in Palencia, Castile and León
Palencia CF (I), founded in 1960 and dissolved in 1986, was a Spanish football club based in Palencia, Castile and León
Palencia CF, founded in 2013 as CDR Atlético Palencia 1929, is a Spanish football club based in Palencia, Castile and León
Palencia Baloncesto, a professional Basketball team based in Palencia, Castile and León
University of Palencia was the first university of Spain
Palencia Cathedral, a cathedral in Palencia, Castile and León
Roman Catholic Diocese of Palencia, a diocese located in the city of Palencia in the Ecclesiastical province of Burgos, Spain
Palencia (Spanish Congress Electoral District)
Palencia, Guatemala, a municipality in the Guatemala department of Guatemala

People
Alfonso de Palencia (1423-1492), a Castilian pre-Renaissance historiographer, lexicographer and humanist
Benjamín Palencia (1894-1980), a Spanish surrealist and painter
Francisco Palencia (1973-), a former Mexican football striker
Brina Palencia (1984-), an American actress, voice actress, ADR director and singer